Muhamed Alrasheed Mahamoud Shambaly (born 1 January 1994) is a Sudanese professional footballer who plays as a midfielder for Al-Merrikh and the Sudan national football team.

References 

Living people
1994 births
Sudanese footballers
Sudan international footballers
Association football midfielders
Al-Merrikh SC players
2021 Africa Cup of Nations players